Birmingham European Airways was originally established in 1983 (as Birmingham Executive Airways). The airline as its name implies was based at Birmingham Airport (BHX/EGBB) in the UK and operated services geared towards business travellers. The airline began operations on 6 June 1983 with three Jetstream 31 aircraft, flying services from Birmingham to Copenhagen, Zurich and Milan. A Saab 340 was introduced in February 1985, but it suffered severe reliability problems in the airline's service, and was retired at the end of the year. To replace the Saab, Birmingham Executive chose the Gulfstream I, operating a wet-leased aircraft from September 1986, with the airline receiving the first of its own Gulfstreams, fitted out as 24-seat airliners in February 1987. Birmingham European Airways later introduced a number of BAC 1-11 aircraft into its fleet.

The airline's route network included points such as Amsterdam, Milan, Oslo, Stuttgart, Newcastle, Belfast and Cork.

In October 1992, Birmingham European merged with Brymon Airways to form Brymon European Airways.

In January 2006 there was news of a new "Birmingham European Airways" being established, once again using Jetstream aircraft to serve European destinations from Birmingham and with the stated aim of starting operations during 2006.

See also
 List of defunct airlines of the United Kingdom

References

External links

History of Duo Airways and its predecessors, including Birmingham European Airways (in German)
New 'Birmingham European Airways' site

Defunct airlines of the United Kingdom
Airlines established in 1983
Airlines disestablished in 1992
1983 establishments in England
1992 disestablishments in England